Henry Frederick Francis Adair Barrington (28 July 1808 Beckett Hall at Shrivenham in Berkshire - 25 March 1882 Knysna), was a South African lawyer, farmer and member of Parliament.

Returning to England in 1848 he married Mary Georgiana Knox, and they landed at Plettenberg Bay, their cargo including wedding gifts, family heirlooms and furniture, and farming equipment. The building of 'Portland Manor' lasted 16 years, and included eight bedrooms, a library, and a large dining room. He also constructed one of the earliest sawmills for cutting Black Stinkwood, experimented with silkworms and bees, and grew apples with a view to producing cider. His interest in silk production and mulberry trees as food plants led to his being featured in South African writer Dalene Matthee’s novel, "Moerbeibos" ('Mulberry Forest'). The great forest fire of February 1869, in which large parts of the forest between Swellendam and Humansdorp were completely destroyed, also gutted 'Portland Manor'. The following year he was elected to the Cape Parliament.

Henry was a son of Reverend George Barrington, 5th Viscount Barrington of Ardglass (1761-1829), prebendary of Durham Cathedral and rector of Sedgefield, and Elizabeth Adair (1769-1841). At first he qualified as a lawyer and joined the diplomatic service, becoming attaché in Athens. Resigning from the service, he landed in Cape Town in February 1842, and bought an estate named 'Portland' near Knysna from Thomas Henry Duthie, who had inherited the property from his father-in-law George Rex.

Marriage and family
Henry married Mary Georgiana Knox from Bath, daughter of Colonel Wright Knox, on 25 July 1848 and they raised a family of three sons and four daughters.

After Henry's death in 1882 the estate was left to his eldest son, John, who died a bachelor in 1901. One of Henry's daughters, Kate, then inherited the estate. Her husband was Francis Newdigate of Forest Hall, who died in the Anglo-Boer War.

Children
John Wildman Shute Barrington b. 17 Nov 1849, d. 23 Sep 1901
Henry Robert Shute Barrington b. 14 Jun 1852, d. 1919
Florina Elizabeth Jane Barrington b. 26 Nov 1853, d. 29 Jul 1912
Samuel William Percy Gordon Shute Barrington b. 24 Nov 1855, d. 19 Feb 1931
Katherine Caroline Barrington b. 19 May 1861, d. 8 Aug 1936
Idonea Maria Barrington b. 21 Aug 1863, d. 13 Feb 1945
Gabrielle Carlotta Barrington b. 13 Feb 1868, d. 19 Aug 1946

References

South African politicians
19th-century South African politicians
1808 births
1882 deaths
Younger sons of viscounts